Mark Roland Shand (28 June 1951 – 23 April 2014) was a British travel writer and conservationist and the brother of Queen Camilla. Shand was the author of four travel books and as a BBC conservationist, appeared in documentaries related to his journeys, most of which centered on the survival of elephants. His book Travels on My Elephant became a bestseller and won the Travel Writer of the Year Award at the British Book Awards in 1992. He was the chairman of Elephant Family, a wildlife foundation, which he co-founded in 2002.

Family, education and marriage
Shand was born on 28 June 1951, as the son of Major Bruce Shand (1917–2006) and his wife, Rosalind Cubitt (1921–1994), daughter of the 3rd Baron Ashcombe and Sonia Rosemary Keppel, daughter of Alice Keppel. He was the brother of Camilla, Queen Consort and Annabel Elliot.

Shand was educated first at St Ronan's School in Kent and then Milton Abbey School in Dorset. He was expelled from Milton Abbey for allegedly smoking cannabis. As a result, his father sent him to Australia to make a living on his own, where he had numerous jobs including working as a jackaroo on a station and a guard at an opal mine. He later returned to London and worked as a porter at Sotheby's, subsequently, he and his friend Harry Fane, the son of the 15th Earl of Westmorland, started a business of selling Cartier jewellery for a while.

In 1990, Shand married Clio Goldsmith, a French former actress, daughter of Edward Goldsmith and niece of Sir James Goldsmith, who were all members of the prominent Goldsmith family. They lived in Rome and had a daughter, Ayesha (born 1995). Shand confirmed in 2010 that the couple were divorced. He was a godfather to one of the sons of Jemima Goldsmith, his former wife's cousin.

Career
Shand published his first travel book Skulduggery in 1987, based on an expedition to Irian Jaya in Indonesia. He later became the author of Travels on My Elephant (1992), Queen of the Elephants (1996) and River Dog: A Journey Down the Brahmaputra  (2003). Travels on My Elephant became a bestseller and won the Travel Writer of the Year Award at the British Book Awards in 1992.

He was featured in many documentaries for the BBC and the National Geographic Channel,
some related to his writings. Elephants were featured in many of his writings and other pursuits. An unabashed Indophile, the majority of his writings and TV features were Indo-Nostalgic. He also had a deep interest in Hinduism and Indian culture.

As a BBC conservationist and travel writer, he authored a book and the corresponding BBC documentary, Queen of the Elephants, based on the life of the first female mahout in recent times — Parbati Barua of Kaziranga. The book went on to win the Prix Litteraire d'Amis award, providing publicity simultaneously to the profession of mahouts, and to Kaziranga.

Shand was actively involved in the conservation of the Asian elephant and co-founded a charity called Elephant Family in 2002. His book Travels on My Elephant was about his adventure with "Tara" (his elephant) in India, who was the inspiration for the charity. Shand was also a patron of Anti-Slavery International, a member of the Royal Geographical Society and an honorary Chief Wildlife Warden of Assam.

In 2014, Mark Shand was awarded "the Conservationist of the Year 2014" and received the Fragile Rhino award of The Perfect World Foundation at the Conservation Gala Dinner "Save The Rhino" in Gothenburg, Sweden. Shand was expected to attend as a guest of honour but unexpectedly died before the event.

Death
On 23 April 2014, it was reported that Shand had been taken to Bellevue Hospital in Manhattan, New York City, after sustaining a serious head injury caused by a fall outside the Rose Bar, of the Gramercy Park Hotel, after lighting a cigarette. Earlier in the evening he had attended a fund-raising auction at Sotheby's in aid of the Elephant Family. Later that same day, it was reported that Shand had died. His nephews Tom Parker Bowles and Ben Elliot flew to New York to escort his body back to the UK. A private funeral service was held for Shand at Holy Trinity Church in Stourpaine, Dorset, on 1 May 2014, where his father's funeral service had been held.

Legacy
To honour his memory as one of the greatest "wildlife" personalities of his generation, the Balipara Foundation Awards in Assam, India, created the Mahout Mark Shand Recognition for Elephant Management award in 2014, shortly called the Mark Shand Mahout Award as a special award, which will be awarded to an individual who has made an outstanding contribution towards the well-being of the Asiatic Elephant population. Also in 2014, St Ronan's in Kent, his former school, dedicated an all-weather pitch named the Shandy-Ba under construction in his memory. Shand was known as a sporty pupil and captained the cricket and rugby teams during his time at the school from 1959 to 1964.

After his death, The Elephant Family received overwhelming support, in reply, the charity launched The Mark Shand Memorial Fund, which will raise funds to save the Asian elephant. The Elephant family also built the Mark Shand Memorial Asian Elephant Learning Centre, a clinic for elephants at the Kaziranga Discovery Park in India, which was launched by life patron Sir Evelyn de Rothschild in November 2015.

Travel books
Skulduggery (1987). Jonathan Cape Ltd. 
Travels on My Elephant (1992). Eland Books. 
 Queen of the Elephants. (1996). Vintage. 
River Dog: A Journey Down the Brahmaputra. (2003).  Little, Brown

References

External links
The Mark Shand Memorial Fund

1951 births
2014 deaths
Goldsmith family
Mark
Cubitt family
Mark
Mark
BBC people
British travel writers
British conservationists
British male journalists
British television journalists
People educated at Milton Abbey School
Writers from London
Accidental deaths from falls
Accidental deaths in New York (state)